Róbert Tomaschek (born 25 August 1972 in Nitra) is a retired Slovak footballer. A midfielder, he played domestically for Plastika Nitra, appearing in 5 league matches. and Slovan Bratislava, as well as Hearts in Scotland. He was also a Slovak international, playing 52 times and scoring 4 goals. He captained his country before retiring early due to injury in 2002, aged 30.

International goals

Score and result list Slovakia's goal tally first.

References

External links
Profile at londonhearts.com
Details of all Tomaschek's international appearances at RSSSF.com

1972 births
Living people
Sportspeople from Nitra
Expatriate footballers in Scotland
FC Nitra players
Heart of Midlothian F.C. players
Slovak Super Liga players
Scottish Premier League players
ŠK Slovan Bratislava players
Slovak expatriate footballers
Slovak expatriate sportspeople in Scotland
Slovak footballers
Slovakia international footballers
Association football midfielders